The term subcooling (also called undercooling) refers to a liquid existing at a temperature below its normal boiling point. For example, water boils at 373 K; at room temperature (293 K) liquid water is termed "subcooled".  A subcooled liquid is the convenient state in which, say,  refrigerants may undergo the remaining stages of a refrigeration cycle. Normally, a refrigeration system has a subcooling stage, allowing technicians to be certain that the quality, in which the refrigerant reaches the next step on the cycle, is the desired one. Subcooling may take place in heat exchangers and outside them. Being both similar and inverse processes, subcooling and superheating are important to determine stability and well-functioning of a refrigeration system.

Applications

Expansion valve operation and compressor safety
Subcooling is normally used so that when the refrigerant reaches the thermostatic expansion valve, all of it is in its liquid form, thus allowing the valve to work properly. If gas reaches the expansion valve a series of unwanted phenomena may occur. These may end up leading to behaviors similar to those observed with the flash-gas phenomena: problems in oil regulation throughout the cycle; excessive and unnecessary misuse of power and waste of electricity; malfunction and deterioration of several components in the installation; irregular performance of the overall systems, and in an unwatched situation, ruined equipment.

Another important and common application of subcooling is its indirect use on the superheating process. Superheating is analogous to subcooling in an operative way, and both processes can be coupled using an internal heat exchanger. Subcooling here serves itself from the superheating and vice versa, allowing heat to flow from the refrigerant at a higher pressure (liquid), to the one with lower pressure (gas). This creates an energetic equivalence between the subcooling and the superheating phenomena when there is no energy loss. Normally, the fluid that is being subcooled is hotter than the refrigerant that is being superheated, allowing an energy flux in the needed direction. Superheating is critical for the operation of compressors because a system lacking it may provide the compressor with a liquid gas mixture, situation that generally leads to the destruction of the gas compressor because liquid is uncompressible. This makes subcooling an easy and widespread source of heat for the superheating process.

System optimization and energy saving
Allowing the subcooling process to occur outside the condenser (as with an internal heat exchanger) is a method of using all of the condensing device's heat exchanging capacity. A huge portion of refrigeration systems use part of the condenser for subcooling which, though very effective and simple, may be considered a diminishing factor in the nominal condensing capacity. A similar situation may be found with superheating taking place in the evaporator, thus an internal heat exchanger is a good and relatively cheap solution for the maximization of heat exchanging capacity.

Another widespread application of subcooling is boosting and economising. Inversely to superheating, subcooling, or the amount of heat withdrawn from the liquid refrigerant on the subcooling process, manifests itself as an increase on the refrigeration capacity of the system. This means that any extra heat removal after the condensation (subcooling) allows a higher ratio of heat absorption on further stages of the cycle. Superheating has exactly the inverse effect. An internal heat exchanger alone is not able to increase the capacity of the system because the boosting effect of subcooling is dimmed by the superheating, making the net capacity gain equal to zero. Some systems are able to move refrigerant and/or to remove heat using less energy because they do so on high pressure fluids that later cool or subcool lower pressure (which are more difficult to cool) fluids.

Natural and artificial subcooling
The subcooling process can happen in many different ways; therefore, it is possible to distinguish between the different parts in which the process takes places. Normally, subcooling refers to the magnitude of the temperature drop which is easily measurable, but it is possible to speak of subcooling in terms of the total heat being removed. The most commonly known subcooling is the condenser subcooling, which is usually known as the total temperature drop that takes place inside the condenser, immediately after the fluid has totally condensed, until it leaves the condensing unit.

Condenser subcooling differs from total subcooling usually because after the condenser, throughout the piping, the refrigerant may naturally tend to cool even more, before it arrives to the expansion valve, but also because of artificial subcooling. The total subcooling is the complete temperature drop the refrigerant undergoes from its actual condensing temperature, to the concrete temperature it has when reaching the expansion valve: this is the effective subcooling.

Natural subcooling is the name normally given to the temperature drop produced inside the condenser (condenser subcooling), combined with the temperature drop happening through the pipeline alone, excluding any heat exchangers of any kind. When there is no mechanical subcooling (i.e. an internal heat exchanger), natural subcooling should equal total subcooling. On the other hand, mechanical subcooling is the temperature reduced by any artificial process that is deliberately placed to create subcooling. This concept refers mainly to devices such as internal heat exchangers, independent subcooling cascades, economisers or boosters.

Economizer and energetic efficiency
Subcooling phenomena is intimately related to efficiency in refrigeration systems. This has led to a lot of research on the field. Most of the interest is placed in the fact that some systems work in better conditions than others due to better (higher) operating pressures, and the compressors that take part of a subcooling loop are usually more efficient than the compressors that are having their liquid subcooled.

Economizer capable screw compressors are being built, which require particular manufacturing finesse. These systems are capable of injecting refrigerant that comes from an internal heat exchanger instead of the main evaporator, in the last portion of the compressing screws. In the named heat exchanger, refrigerant liquid at high pressure is subcooled, resulting in mechanical subcooling. There is also a huge quantity of systems being built in booster display. This is similar to economizing, as the compressor's efficiency of one of the compressors (the one working on higher pressures) is known to be better than the other (the compressors working with lower pressures). Economizers and booster systems usually differ in the fact that the first ones are able to do the same subcooling using only one compressor able to economize, the latter systems must do the process with two separate compressors.

Besides boosting and economizing, it is possible to produce cascade subcooling systems, able to subcool the liquid with an analogous and separate system. This procedure is complex and costly as it involves the use of a complete system (with compressors and all of the gear) only for subcooling. Still, the idea has raised some investigation as there are some purported benefits. Furthermore, the United States Department of Energy issued a Federal Technology Alert mentioning refrigerant subcooling as a reliable way of improving the performance of systems and saving energy. Making this kind of system operationally independent from the main system and commercially possible is subject to study due to the mentioned claims. The separation of the subcooling unit from the main cycle (in terms of design) is not known to be an economically viable alternative. This kind of system usually requires the use of expensive electronic control systems to monitor the fluid thermodynamic conditions. Recently, a product capable of increasing the system's capacity by adding mechanical subcooling to any generic unspecific refrigeration system has been developed in Chile.

The subcooling principle behind all these applications is the fact that, in terms of heat transfer, all the subcooling is directly added to the cooling capacity of the refrigerant (as superheating would be directly deducted). As compressors that are subcooling work on this easier conditions, higher pressure makes their refrigerant cycles more efficient, and the heat withdrawn by this means, cheaper than the one withdrawn by the main system, in terms of energy.

Transcritical carbon dioxide systems
In a common refrigeration system, the refrigerant undergoes phase changes from gas to liquid and from liquid back to gas. This enables to consider and discuss superheating and subcooling phenomena, mainly because gas must be cooled to become liquid and liquid must be heated back to become gas. As there are little possibilities of completing this for the totality of the flowing refrigerant without undercooling or overheating, in conventional vapor-compression refrigeration both processes are unavoidable and always appear.

On the other hand, transcritical systems make the refrigerant go through another state of matter during the cycle. Particularly, the refrigerant (usually carbon dioxide) does not go through a regular condensation process but instead passes through a gas cooler in a supercritical phase. To talk about condensation temperature and subcooling under these conditions is not entirely possible. There is a lot of actual research on this subject concerning multiple staged processes, ejectors, expanders and several other devices and upgrades. Gustav Lorentzen outlined some modifications to the cycle including two staged internal subcooling for these kind of systems. Due to the particular nature of these systems, the topic of subcooling must be treated accordingly, having in mind that the conditions of the fluid that leaves the gas cooler in supercritical systems, must be directly specified using temperature and pressure.

See also

 Heat transfer
 Economizer
 Evaporation
 Superheated water
 Condenser
 Screw compressors
 Refrigerant
 List of refrigerants
 Carbon dioxide
 Thermal expansion valve
 Refrigeration cycle
 Vapor-compression refrigeration
 Evaporator
 Condensation
 Thermodynamics
 Gustav Lorentzen

References

Thermodynamic cycles
Heat pumps